List of Virtual Console games for Wii U may refer to:
 List of Virtual Console games for Wii U (North America)
 List of Virtual Console games for Wii U (PAL region)
 List of Virtual Console games for Wii U (Japan)